Baruun-Urt (west-long) is a town in eastern Mongolia and the capital of Sükhbaatar Province. The town with its vicinities creates a sum (district) of Sükhbaatar Province. The Baruun-Urt sum area is 59 km², population 15,549,  population density 265 per km² (2008). It forms an enclave within the surrounding Sükhbaatar sum.

Tömörtiin Ovoo Zinc Mine lies about 13 km north of the town.

Population

Transportation 
The Baruun-Urt Airport (UUN/ZMBU) has paved runway and cars There is a charter flight connecting the city to the capital when there are passengers. Usually MIAT, Mongolian Airlines doesn't fly to remote provinces especially to Sukhbaatar province but other two local airlines sometimes do. Recently some small airlines which has up to 8 seats started flying to suburban areas.

Climate

Baruun-Urt experiences a cold semi-arid climate (Köppen BSk) with long, very dry, frigid winters and short, very warm summers.

References 

Districts of Sükhbaatar Province
Aimag centers